Wanda Marie Allan-Parsons (born 24 January 1955) is a Canadian archer.

Career 

She finished fourth in the women's team at the 1975 World Archery Championships.

Allan competed in the women's individual event at the 1976 Summer Olympics finishing
sixteenth and also in the women's individual event at the 1984 Summer Olympics where she came 36th.

She was inducted into the Victoria Sports Hall of Fame in 2017 while working as a quilter.

References

External links 

 Profile on worldarchery.org

1955 births
Living people
Canadian female archers
Olympic archers of Canada
Archers at the 1976 Summer Olympics
Archers at the 1984 Summer Olympics